The 2011 Letran Knights men's basketball team represented Colegio de San Juan de Letran in the 87th season of the National Collegiate Athletic Association in the Philippines. The men's basketball tournament for the school year 2011-12 began on July 2, 2011, and the host school for the season was University of Perpetual Help System DALTA.

The Knights finished the double round-robin eliminations at third place with 14 wins against 4 losses, securing a Final Four spot again after a disappointing fifth-place finish last season. In the second-round of eliminations, the Knights pulled off an upset in overtime as they halted the San Sebastian Stags' 15-game winning run. In the Final Four, the Knights pulled off another upset again as they forced the Stags in a knockout match, but they faltered in the next game. Kevin Alas and Raymond Almazan were named members of the Mythical Five, and Almazan also bagged the NCAA Most Improved Player honors.

Roster 

 Depth chart Depth chart

NCAA Season 87 games results 

Elimination games were played in a double round-robin format. All games were aired on Studio 23.

Source: PBA-Online

Awards

References 

Letran Knights basketball team seasons